Pyrenecosa is a wolf spider genus, with three European species.

See also 
 List of Lycosidae genera

References 

 

Lycosidae
Araneomorphae genera